Once in a Long, Long While... is the third album by Icelandic band Low Roar, released in 2017. The album's lyrics are inspired by Ryan Karazija's recent divorce and his life as an expatriate in Iceland. One reviewer described the album as "flow[ing] between dreamy and floating and more solidly rhythmic tracks," and another described it as having an "atmosphere [that] never permits the sun to linger for very long, shutting it out with harsh, icy synth." The song “Waiting (10 Years)" was released as a single.

Track listing

References 

2017 albums
Low Roar albums